The grey square (Pardasena virgulana) is a species of moth in the family Nolidae.

The larva feeds on okra and Leguminosae and in some areas it is considered a pest.

References

Moths described in 1880
Chloephorinae
Moths of Cape Verde
Moths of Africa
Moths of Madagascar
Moths of Mauritius
Moths of Réunion
Moths of the Middle East